Moen Church is a parish church of the Church of Norway in Gran Municipality in Innlandet county, Norway. It is located in the northern part of the village of Jaren. It is one of the churches for the Moen/Ål parish which is part of the Hadeland og Land prosti (deanery) in the Diocese of Hamar. The brown, wooden church was built in a long church design in 1914 using plans drawn up by the architect Harald Aars. The church seats about 170 people.

History
Around 1910, the municipality began planning for a new annex chapel in Jaren. After a public meeting in October 1910, a committee was appointed in the Moen district, which at that time numbered 915 inhabitants. A three-acre plot of land was donated by Kjersti and Johan Trulserud and the people of the Tingelstad area gave timber, and a fundraising campaign was initiated. The church was designed as a long church in the National Romantic style. The new Moen Chapel was consecrated on 18 June 1914. Around the turn of the 21st century, the chapel was re-titled as a church in a new combined parish with Ål Church.

Media gallery

See also
List of churches in Hamar

References

Gran, Norway
Churches in Innlandet
Long churches in Norway
Wooden churches in Norway
20th-century Church of Norway church buildings
Churches completed in 1914
1914 establishments in Norway